Preservation may refer to:

Heritage and conservation 
 Preservation (library and archival science), activities aimed at prolonging the life of a record while making as few changes as possible
 Preservation (magazine), published by the National Trust for Historic Preservation
 Historic preservation, endeavor to preserve, conserve and protect buildings, objects, landscapes or other artifacts
 Conservation and restoration of cultural heritage, protection and care of tangible cultural heritage

Mathematics and computer science 
 Type preservation, property of a type system if evaluation of expressions does not cause their type to change
 Case preservation, when computer storage preserves the distinction between upper and lower case 
 Digital preservation, endeavor to ensure that digital information of continuing value remains accessible and usable

Arts and entertainment 
 Preservation (2018 novel), historical fiction by Jock Serong about the wreck of the Sydney Cove (1796 ship).
Preservation (2014 film), a horror thriller film
Preservation Act 1, 1973 album by The Kinks
Preservation Act 2, 1974 album by The Kinks
"Preservation" (song), a 1974 non-album single by The Kinks
 Preservation Hall, jazz venue in New Orleans, Louisiana

Other uses 
 Preservation Island, Tasmania, Australia
 Preservation Islets, group of small granite islands northwest of Preservation Island
 Food preservation, preserving food for later use
 Preservative, chemicals used to hinder deterioration of food, wood, etc.
 Self-preservation, behavior that ensures the survival of an organism

See also
 
 Conservation (disambiguation)
 Heritage (disambiguation)
 Preserve (disambiguation)
 Protection (disambiguation)
 Heritage Preservation, an American non-profit organization to preserve the nation's heritage
 National Preservation, a British-based online company that specialises in retail and discussion among railway enthusiasts